Samnapur railway station is a small railway station in Balaghat district, Madhya Pradesh. Its code is SMC. It serves Samnapur village.

Samnapur was a railway station of the Satpura narrow gauge railway, today part of Nagpur railway division of South East Central Railway zone. In October 2015 all narrow gauge network in Nagpur division (622 km), was closed for gauge conversion, except –Naghbir line. The approval of the gauge conversion works have been involved in controversy, since the Union's environment ministry authorized the construction works in Balaghat–Nainpur section (77 km), which passes through Kanha – Pench tiger corridor.

The station is on the Jabalpur–Gondia line (227 km), almost entirely converted to broad gauge. , a small stretch of 25 km remains closed for conversion, from Samnapur to  station (25 km).

References

External links 
 Jabalpur - Sukrimangela BG line delayed. To be operational by early august
 Century-old narrow gauge train track finally gets new lease of life
 Funds crunch hits gauge conversion work

Railway stations in Balaghat district
Nagpur SEC railway division